Night Things is the sixth studio album by American country music artist Ronnie Milsap, released in 1975. It produced a #1 country hit in its title track, and "Just in Case" was a #4 single as well.

Track listing

Production
Executive Producer: Dave Nives
Produced By Tom Collins & Jack D. Johnson
Engineers: Bill Harris, Al Pachucki, David Roys, Mike Shockley, Bill Vandevort

Personnel
Drums: Hayword Bishop, Kenny Malone
Percussion: Charlie McCoy, Farrell Morris
Bass Guitar: Mike Leech, Henry Strzelecki
Upright Bass: Joe Zinkan
Piano: Ronnie Milsap, Bobby Ogdin, Hargus "Pig" Robbins, Jay Spell, Bobby Wood
Guitars: Harold Bradley, Jimmy Capps, Ray Edenton, Steve Gibson, Glenn Keener, Dale Sellars, Chip Young, Reggie Young
Steel Guitar: Pete Drake, Lloyd Green, John Hughey
Harmonica: Charlie McCoy, Terry McMillan
Fiddle: Jim Buchanan, Marcy Cates, Tommy Williams
Lead Vocals: Ronnie Milsap
Backing Vocals: Ronnie Milsap, The Jordanaires
Strings arranged by D. Bergen White

Charts

Singles

1975 albums
RCA Records albums
Ronnie Milsap albums
Albums produced by Tom Collins (record producer)